Fire Station No. 1 is a historic fire station located at 425 S Tacoma Avenue in Tacoma, Washington. It was listed on the National Register of Historic Places on May 2, 1986 as one of eleven properties in a thematic group, "Historic Fire Stations of Tacoma, Washington".

See also
 Historic preservation
 National Register of Historic Places listings in Pierce County, Washington

References

1919 establishments in Washington (state)
Buildings and structures in Tacoma, Washington
Bungalow architecture in Washington (state)
Fire stations completed in 1919
Fire stations on the National Register of Historic Places in Washington (state)
National Register of Historic Places in Tacoma, Washington